Christa Teresa Hughes is an Australian singer, circus performer and comedian. She utilises wild on-stage antics and a powerful voice. From age 15, she has performed gigs with her father, jazz pianist, journalist and broadcaster, Dick Hughes. At age 17 had a regular set at Sydney's Shakespeare Hotel. She was the vocalist for the band Machine Gun Fellatio (as KK Juggy) from 2000 to 2005. Alongside her solo career, Hughes was also the Ring Mistress with Circus Oz (2006–08) and has issued an album, 21st Century Blues (2010) with her father.

Biography

Christa Hughes was raised in the Sydney suburb of Vaucluse. Her father, Richard "Dick" Hughes, was a journalist and sometime jazz pianist. Hughes later recalled that her parents "were hard-working people, we just happened to live in a posh suburb. In fact, I think the suburb tried to have us moved out several times because we were the noisiest household on the block." She is a granddaughter of the journalist and writer, Richard Hughes (1906–1984) and his wife, May Hughes née Bennett.

She started singing at the age of 15 with her father. She opened and sang with international blues artists when they were in Sydney such as Brownie McGhee, Swamp Boogie Queen Katie Webster and Champion Jack Dupree. After she turned 21, Hughes travelled the world, singing in New York, Edinburgh, London and Paris. Hughes returned to Australia in 2000. She wrote and starred in musical theatre, cabaret shows, Sleepless Beauty (June 2002), Beer Drinking Woman (June 2003) and Temptation. She was also singing and dancing, as KK Juggy (KK for knickers and knockers, respectively) or Spark Jug for Machine Gun Fellatio from 2000 to 2005. From 2006 to 2008 she was the ring mistress with Circus Oz. In 2010 Christa and her father, Dick Hughes, released an album, 21st Century Blues. A documentary, You Only Live Twice, by Brendan Young, about her family's life was broadcast.
In November 2011 Christa released Shonky with the Honky Tonk Shonks.

Discography

Albums

Extended plays

Awards and nominations

ARIA Music Awards
The ARIA Music Awards is an annual awards ceremony that recognises excellence, innovation, and achievement across all genres of Australian music. They commenced in 1987. 

! 
|-
| 2010
| Twenty First Century Blues
| Best Jazz Album
| 
| 
|-

References

External links 

  - archived copy (7 March 2018)

Year of birth missing (living people)
Living people
Australian women singers
Australian musicians
Machine Gun Fellatio members
Singers from Sydney
Comedians from Sydney
20th-century Australian musicians
21st-century Australian musicians